Cocky is the fifth studio album by American musician Kid Rock. Released in 2001, it is his third release for Atlantic Records.

The album is known for featuring the ballad "Picture", recorded as a duet with Sheryl Crow. In May 2011, the album was certified 5× platinum by the RIAA and has sold 5,344,000 copies in the US as of December 2013. According to Kid Rock's official website that made a timeline for his 45th birthday in January 2016, Cocky was certified 6× platinum on August 26, 2008. However, RIAA only certified the album at 5× platinum.

The album was dedicated to Rock's former assistant and hype man Joe C., who died in November of the previous year from celiac disease complications. 75 songs were written for the album, but only 30 of them were recorded as a song for the album. One of the recorded songs that did not make the album was "If I Was President", a standard blues song that Kid Rock plays frequently in concert. Another song left off the album was the Joe C. eulogy "In Your Lifetime". "Picture" received a CMA nomination in 2003 for Vocal Event of the Year and would go on to be Rock's first gold single. Some of the songs that were recorded during this album's sessions appeared on Kid Rock's self-titled album.

Music
Cocky saw a shift in Kid Rock's sound, featuring more ballads and less rapping than the preceding albums, and featuring more classic rock influence.

Entertainment Weekly writer Rob Brunner described Cocky as a concept album, stating, "Boastful and defensive, confrontational and thin-skinned, loud, rude, and proud of it, Kid Rock is a composite of blatantly unpleasant stereotypes sure to scare the neighbors: strutting ghetto pimp, Skynyrd-loving redneck, heavy metal burnout."

"Trucker Anthem" contains a sample from The Wizard of Oz.

Brunner described "Midnight Train to Memphis" as MOR country, and "Lonely Road of Faith" as a power ballad.

"You Never Met a Motherfucker Quite Like Me" makes lyrical references to Hank Williams Jr., ZZ Top's Billy Gibbons, Run-DMC's Joseph Simmons, and Willie Nelson.

Reception

Cocky received mixed reviews from critics, earning a 57 out of 100 rating on Metacritic.

Stephen Thomas Erlewine, writing for AllMusic, gave the album four out of five stars, writing, "unpretentious, blue-collar hard rock hasn't sounded this good in nearly 20 years, and that's reason enough to celebrate."

Entertainment Weekly writer Rob Brunner gave the album a B, writing, "Kid Rock's tear-down-the-walls ideal of a world where rappers can sip whiskey with rednecks is a compelling fiction, and if the cross-pollinated musical results aren't always as exciting as the conversation no doubt would be, you have to at least admire the breadth of his vision." Brunner felt that "Too much of Cocky meanders into boring stylistic experiments", calling "Picture" a "sappy duet".

Rolling Stone writer Barry Walters gave Cocky three out of five stars, writing, "Rock self-consciously builds on his badass-hick-with-a-heart-of-gold image [...] [The execution] is really corn, [...] Rock's AC/DC, Run-D.M.C. and Lynyrd Skynyrd. tributes now come across as clunky imitation."

Release and promotion
The album's first single was the rap rock track "Forever". The song charted at number 18 on Mainstream Rock and number 21 on Modern Rock. He performed the song on TRL and The Late Show with David Letterman, leading to a number 8 debut (it would climb to number 3 after release of Picture). He and Hank Williams Jr would perform on CMT Crossroads in late 2001. The second single was the ballad "Lonely Road of Faith", released in January 2002. The song was heavily promoted by WWE in the video tribute to the History of WWE. The song was also heard on WB's Smallville and MTV's Real World. Kid Rock would go on "The Cocky Tour" then join Aerosmith and Run DMC on the "Girls Of Summer Tour". The song would peak at number 15 on the Mainstream Rock Tracks. In July 2002, a censored version of "You Never Met a Motherfucker Quite Like Me" was released to radio and peaked at number 32 on the Mainstream Rock Tracks. Kid Rock would test out "Picture" at CMT's Farm Aid with Allison Moorer filling in for Sheryl Crow. When Sheryl Crow's label butted heads with Rock he released the song in November 2002 with Allison Moorer. As the Allison Moorer version began climbing the country charts, Sheryl Crow's people changed their minds. The Sheryl Crow version was released in January 2003. It would become Kid Rock's first crossover hit charting at number 4 on the Hot 100, number 5 on the Top 40, number 2 on Adult Contemporary and number 17 on country radio. The single would be certified gold and spend 52 weeks on top the Country Singles Sales chart; it also peaked at number 1 on the US Singles Sales charts and number 2 on the Canadian Singles Sales chart. The song would be Sheryl Crow's second most successful single after "All I Wanna Do". The album climbed all the way back to number three. The song would be his first gold single and push the album from 1.8 million sold to 4.7 million sold (Cocky since has sold about 5.4 million). The song was nominated for CMA Vocal Event of The Year.

Track listing

A clean version is also available, removing most vulgarity, as well as the song "WCSR". The clean version of the disc also features a picture of Kid Rock's face on the disc, while the unedited version has an image of Rock's hands with raised middle fingers (a reference to Rock's previous album Devil Without a Cause which featured just Rock's right hand making the same gesture); both feature Kid Rock's name. The edited version of Cocky also renames track 8 "You Never Met a White Boy Quite Like Me".

Credits
Kid Rock – vocals; lead guitar, rhythm guitar, acoustic guitar, slide guitar, Dobro, banjo, steel guitar, synthesizer, turntables, harmonica, organ, piano, bass, drum machine

Twisted Brown Trucker
Misty Love – vocals
Shirley Hayden – vocals
Kenny Olson – bass, lead guitar, rhythm guitar
Jason Krause – lead guitar, rhythm guitar
Uncle Kracker – vocals, turntables
Jimmie Bones – piano, organ, harmonica, keyboards, vocals
Stefanie Eulinberg – drums, percussion, vocals

Guests
Snoop Dogg – vocals on "WCSR"
Sheryl Crow – bass, vocals, twelve-string guitar
Matt O'Brien – bass on "Trucker Anthem"
Paradime – vocals on "Forever"
David Spade – smart-ass on "Midnight Train to Memphis"
 Jeff Grand - Free Bird solo

Charts

Weekly charts

Year-end charts

Decade-end charts

Certifications

References

Kid Rock albums
2001 albums
Lava Records albums
Atlantic Records albums
Hard rock albums by American artists
Heavy metal albums by American artists
Midwest hip hop albums
Southern rock albums
Albums in memory of deceased persons